Lawrence William Boynton (August 12, 1877 – June 19, 1937) was an American football player, coach, collegiate track and field athlete, and lawyer. He served as the head coach at the University of Kansas in 1900, at Sewanee: The University of the South in 1902, and at Washington University in St. Louis from 1903 to 1904, compiling a career college football record of 17–18–4.

Early life and college career
Boynton was born in Whitney Point, New York on August 12, 1877 to George G. and Eliza Ann (née Boatman) Boynton where he also grew up. He attended Cornell University from 1897 to 1900, graduating with a degree in law. While at Cornell he played on the varsity football team as well as the varsity track & field team. Boynton lettered in track & field in 1899 and 1900 primarily competing in the hammer throw. He had the seventh best throw in the nation in 1900 with a distance of 44.9m in a meet in Philadelphia, Pennsylvania.

Coaching career

Kansas
Boynton became the head football coach at the University of Kansas the fall after he graduated from Cornell. He coached the 1900 Kansas Jayhawks football team to a record of 2–5–2 with wins over Ottawa University and the University of South Dakota and ties against Emporia State University and the Missouri Tigers.

Later life and death
After he finished coaching at Kansas in 1900 he returned to New York state where Boynton married Grace G. Stanton on September 6, 1902, just 2 months before he would head off to coach at Sewanee. He later worked as a lawyer first in New York state starting in 1905 even though he had already passed the New York Bar exam in 1900, then in Florida for four years starting in 1926, and finally in North Carolina starting in 1929. Boynton died on June 19, 1937, at the home of his parents in Whitney Point, New York. He was buried back in his hometown of Whitney Point, New York in Riverside Cemetery.

Head coaching record

Football

References

1877 births
1937 deaths
19th-century players of American football
Cornell Big Red football players
Kansas Jayhawks football coaches
Sewanee Tigers football coaches
Washington University Bears football coaches
Washington University Bears men's basketball coaches
Cornell Law School alumni
People from Broome County, New York
Florida lawyers
New York (state) lawyers
North Carolina lawyers